William Herbert Pierce (born April 30, 1890 and died August 1962) was a Negro leagues catcher, first baseman and manager for several years before the founding of the first Negro National League, and in its first few seasons.

Nicknamed "Bonehead" and "Big Bill Pierce", he played for the Philadelphia Giants at the age of 20. During the winter, he often played baseball in Cuba and Florida. Pierce would play most of his seasons for the Lincoln Giants.

Pierce would follow his battery mate Ad Lankford from the Lincoln Giants after their successful 1915 season, to join the Pennsylvania Red Caps of New York.

He registered for the WWI draft on June 5, 1917, listing his occupation as a Porter for the Pennsylvania Railroad Station in Manhattan. He also lists himself as married and living at 2229 5th Avenue in New York City.

Pierce managed the Baltimore Black Sox in 1922. His last known season as a player was 1924, for the Detroit Stars at the age of 34.

At the age of 62, Pierce received votes listing him on the 1952 Pittsburgh Courier player-voted poll of the Negro leagues' best players ever.

He died at the age of 72.

References

External links
 and Baseball-Reference Black Baseball stats and Seamheads

1890 births
1962 deaths
Baseball players from Indiana
Bacharach Giants players
Baltimore Black Sox players
Chicago American Giants players
Club Fé players
Cuban baseball players
Detroit Stars players
Lincoln Giants players
Negro league baseball managers
Pennsylvania Red Caps of New York players
Philadelphia Giants players
Schenectady Mohawk Giants players
American expatriate baseball players in Cuba